The Interstate 24 Bridge may refer to one of two distinct bridges on Interstate 24.

Illinois-Kentucky 

The Interstate 24 Bridge is a two-span tied arch bridge that carries I-24 across the Ohio River. It is one of two road bridges connecting the Metropolis-Brookport, Illinois area with Paducah, Kentucky, with the other being the Brookport Bridge upstream to the east.

Tennessee 

The Interstate 24 Bridge is a continuous box and plate girder bridge over the Tennessee River opened on December 18, 1967. It is just slightly upstream from Nickajack Dam and was within sight of the former Marion Memorial Bridge.

References

Further reading
Interstate 24 Bridge at Bridges & Tunnels

Road bridges in Illinois
Buildings and structures in McCracken County, Kentucky
Buildings and structures in Massac County, Illinois
Buildings and structures in Marion County, Tennessee
I
Bridges completed in 1973
Bridges on the Interstate Highway System
Tied arch bridges in the United States
Girder bridges in the United States
Bridges over the Ohio River
Road bridges in Tennessee
Road bridges in Kentucky
Bridges over the Tennessee River
Transportation in McCracken County, Kentucky
Transportation in Massac County, Illinois
Transportation in Marion County, Kentucky